is a 1986 Japanese animated science fiction action-adventure film based on the seventh volume of the same name of the Doraemon Long Stories series. The original plot was written by Fujiko F. Fujio. Alternate titles include The Platoon of Iron Men, or The Robot Army. The film pays homage to many anime series featuring giant robots or "mecha", most notably Gundam and Mazinger. It is the seventh Doraemon film.

An English dub was produced and released exclusively in Malaysia by Speedy Video as Doraemon - Nobita Tetsujinheiden.

This film was later remade in 3D.

Plot
The movie begins at the playground with Suneo showing off Micross, his new radio-controlled toy robot. Jealous, Nobita runs back home and begs Doraemon to build him a giant robot to upstage Suneo. Doraemon refuses and they argue, causing him to storm off to the North Pole using his Anywhere Door. Nobita soon follows after and discovers a bowling ball-like mechanical orb that can summon parts for a giant robot.

After returning home with the orb, Nobita and Doraemon decide to build the robot in an uninhabited mirror world accessed by using Doraemon's Opposite World Entrance Oil on a surface of water. The completed robot seems to lack a brain, so Doraemon uses a psychic controller to allow them to pilot it. Meanwhile in the real world, Nobita's mother accidentally trips on the orb and locks it in a shed.

Doraemon christens the robot "Zandacross" after Santa Claus since it was found at the North Pole. Nobita invites Shizuka to play with them and even pilot the robot. While doing so, she accidentally fires lasers at a skyscraper, utterly destroying it. The group becomes devastated when they realize that Zandacross is actually a weapon of war. Realizing what could've happened if they were in the real world, they abandon both the robot and the mirror world, and vow never to speak of them again.

Meanwhile, a mysterious scantily-clad girl is tracking Zandacross at the North Pole. Her search leads her to Japan and to Nobita. She reveals that her name is Lilulu and she is the true owner of the robot, who she calls Judo. Nobita reluctantly leads her to the robot's location in the mirror world and hands her the psychic controller. Lilulu offers to forgive Nobita for the theft if she can use the mirror world, but makes Nobita promise to keep this a secret.

That night, Nobita investigates the mirror world to find Lilulu leading a group of robots in building a large facility. Nobita also finds Doraemon following him due to his recent despondent behavior. Nobita reveals what happened between him and Lilulu, as well as his suspicion that she may be an alien. The two learn that the robots are preparing for an invasion of Earth so they escape back into the real world. Lilulu and Zandacross pursue them, but Zandacross is too big to fit through the portal and ends up destroying it catastrophically, trapping the robots in the mirror world. Nobita and Doraemon rejoice that the Earth has been saved.

The next day, Doraemon discovers the orb beeping incessantly. Using his Translation Jelly to allow the orb to speak, he discovers that the orb is in fact Judo, the mechanical brain meant to pilot Zandacross. Judo further reveals that it has already signaled the rest of the robot army to commence their invasion of Earth.

No adults believe Doraemon or Nobita's story, so they recruit Suneo, Gian, and Micross (who Doraemon has given sentience and the ability to talk) to stop the invasion. They use the World Entrance Oil on Shizuka's bathtub to create another entrance to the mirror world, where they reunite a reprogrammed Judo with Zandacross so it can be their ally. Shizuka also ends up in the mirror world and finds an injured Lilulu, who is revealed to be an android.

Shizuka tends to Lilulu as she doesn't believe the android to be bad at heart. Lilulu shares the history of her home planet Mechatopia, explaining how robots were created by God after he gave up on humanity. Robots initially enslaved each other until a revolution led to robot freedom. So as a compromise, the robots decided to invade Earth and enslave humanity instead. Shizuka remarks how this is similar to the violent history of humanity and that God would be displeased, causing Lilulu to angrily attack her before passing out from her own injuries.

Meanwhile, Nobita and friends hatch a plan to use Zandacross' signal to lure the robot army into the mirror world using the mountain lake as the entrance. The army immediately attacks major cities upon arriving, but they can find no signs of actual people. Lilulu manages to escape and meet with the army's leader, but she does not reveal the truth about the mirror world. Instead, she pleads with them to end the invasion, claiming that humanity is just like them and should not be enslaved. Enraged, the robot leader imprisons Lilulu, but she is freed by Nobita and Doraemon.

The robots eventually discover the ruse when they realize the entire planet is backwards. They rendezvous at the lake entrance to return to the real world, but Nobita and friends are already waiting there to battle them. Meanwhile, Shizuka, Lilulu, and Micross decide to use Doraemon's time machine to travel back in time to ancient Mechatopia so they can plead with God to change the robots. They meet with God, an elderly man, and he agrees to reprogram the two progenitor robots Amu and Imu so that Mechatopia's history will be rewritten. But he is too frail to finish the process so Lilulu does so instead, despite being aware that doing so will erase her existence as well.

Back in the present, the robots are on the verge of defeating Nobita and gang when they suddenly start disappearing. Back in ancient Mechatopia, Lilulu also begins disappearing and shares a final handshake with Shizuka before she is erased completely. A heartbroken Shizuka rejoins her friends in the present and tells them about Lilulu's end.

Some time later, Nobita is being left afterschool and wonders what has become of Mechatopia. Suddenly, he sees Lilulu flying outside the window. As the end credits begin, he runs out to tell the rest of his friends and exclaims that Lilulu has become an angel, though they don't believe him. As the end credits continue, Lilulu flies into space, giving the Earth a wave goodbye before continuing on.

Cast

Design issues
Mecha fans thought the mecha was similar to the MSN-100 Hyaku Shiki from Yoshiyuki Tomino's Mobile Suit Z Gundam, thinking that the mechanical designer was Kunio Okawara. However this was proven false as the true mecha designer was manga artist Takaya Kenji.

Other versions
A different version of the film called Doraemon: Robot Wars was produced by Wang Film Productions three years before the release of the original feature film. The story is completely different from the original source. This version only exists as partial clips and images.

References

External links
 
Official Doraemon 25 movie page
 

Films directed by Tsutomu Shibayama
Nobita and the Steel Troops
1986 anime films
1986 films
Alien invasions in films
Films scored by Shunsuke Kikuchi
1980s children's animated films
Japanese children's films